Lightning in the South (Spanish:El rayo del sur) is a 1943 Mexican film. It stars Domingo Soler.

External links
 

1943 films
1940s Spanish-language films
Mexican black-and-white films
Mexican war drama films
1940s war drama films
1943 drama films
1940s Mexican films